The 2009 Virginia Tech Hokies football team represented Virginia Polytechnic Institute and State University during the 2009 NCAA Division I FBS football season. The team's head coach was Frank Beamer. The Hokies finished the season 10–3 (6–2 ACC) and won the Chick-fil-A Bowl, 37–14, over Tennessee.

Coaching staff

Schedule

*Vacated by North Carolina

Source: ACC

Roster

Rankings

Season summary

Nebraska

Flyovers
Virginia Tech home games have featured flyovers by military aircraft.

Statistics

Team

Offense

Rushing

Passing

Receiving

References

External links

Virginia Tech
Virginia Tech Hokies football seasons
Peach Bowl champion seasons
Virginia Tech Hokies football